Minipop is an American-based Indie electronic and dream pop band formed in 2004 in Oakland, California. The band consists of Tricia Kanne (vocals/guitar), Lauren Grubb (drums), Matthew Swanson (guitar/keyboard) and Nick Forte (bass).

The band garnered much popularity and attention when they self-produced their first EP, Precious EP in 2006.

The band is signed to Take Root Records, an independent record label. Their debut record with the label, A New Hope, was released on November 7, 2007.

Discography

Studio albums
 A New Hope (2007)

EPs
 Precious EP (2006)
 Automatic Love EP (2010)
 Chances EP (2014)

See also
 Hazel English

References

External links
 Official MySpace page
 Take Root Records Website
 Amplifier Magazine
 Spin Magazine Online Artist of the Day
 Review on Indieball
 Official Facebook page

Indie rock musical groups from California
Musical groups from Oakland, California